The Dr. Branivoj Đorđević Award is an award given by the Yugoslav Drama Theatre to honour excellence in theatre performance and diction. The award is named after the prominent academy professor Dr. Branivoj Đorđević, famous for his TV drama Sokratova odbrana I smrt.

Recipients

References

European awards
Serbian theatre awards
Theatre acting awards